The Gregory Hines Show is an American television sitcom that aired on CBS. The series premiered on Monday, September 15, 1997, before airing on September 19, 1997, as a part of the network's Block Party Friday night lineup. It ended its run on February 27, 1998, with 15 episodes aired out of the 22 that were produced.

Background
The Gregory Hines Show was the only show on the Block Party lineup that was not produced by Warner Bros. Television or Miller-Boyett Productions. Compared to the Miller-Boyett series, The Gregory Hines Show was markedly more mature in its themes; Leslie Moonves, incoming head of CBS at the time, described the inclusion of the show in the block as an effort to target the whole family, and executives at Miller-Boyett were fully pleased to have the show in the block, as TGIF, the block for which they had previously produced shows for the ABC-TV network, was quickly shifting into a teen-oriented block that did not fit their style.

Premise
The series starred Gregory Hines as Ben Stevenson, a publishing agent and widower raising 12-year-old son Matty (Brandon Hammond). A year and a half after his wife's death, Ben decides to resume his social life and begin dating again. He soon realizes that he has a lot to re-learn about women, just as his son is learning about them for the first time. Ben and Matty had previously had no trouble talking about anything, but now even the simplest conversation has become complicated, especially when the topic is the women in their lives. Now and then Ben receives advice from his brother Carl (Wendell Pierce), his father James (Bill Cobbs), as well as his co-worker Alex (Mark Tymchyshyn), Alex's ex-wife, Nicole (Robin Riker) and his assistant Angela (Judith Shelton).

Cast
 Gregory Hines as Ben Stevenson
 Brandon Hammond as Matthew "Matty" Stevenson
 Wendell Pierce as Carl Stevenson 
 Mark Tymchyshyn as Alex Butler
 Robin Riker as Nicole Moran 
 Bill Cobbs as James Stevenson
 Judith Shelton as Angela Rice

Episodes

References

External links
 
 

1990s American black sitcoms
1990s American sitcoms
1997 American television series debuts
1998 American television series endings
CBS original programming
English-language television shows
Television shows set in Chicago
Television series by CBS Studios
Television series by Sony Pictures Television